is a railway station in Mashiko, Tochigi Prefecture, Japan, operated by the Mooka Railway.

Lines
Nanai Station is a station on the Mooka Line, and is located 28.4 rail kilometers from the terminus of the line at Shimodate Station.

Station layout
Nanai Station has two opposed side platforms connected to the station building by a level crossing. The station is unattended.

History
Nanai Station opened on 11 July 1913 as a station on the Japanese Government Railway, which subsequently became the Japanese National Railways (JNR). The station was absorbed into the JR East network upon the privatization of the JNR on 1 April 1987, and the Mooka Railway from 11 April 1988. The original station building burned down in 2000, and a new one was built later that year.

Surrounding area
Nanai Post Office
Japan National Route 123

References

External links

 Mooka Railway Station information 

Railway stations in Tochigi Prefecture
Railway stations in Japan opened in 1913
Mashiko, Tochigi